This is a list of chart records and achievements by American singer and entertainer Whitney Houston. Nicknamed "The Voice", during her career, Houston set numerous charts and sales records, and furthermore received many outstanding awards. The US sales records are certified by the RIAA and can be considered accurate. The US chart positions are official through the Billboard. However, world sales are a close estimate, as no process exists that certifies global sales.

Sales and certification records 
 Whitney Houston was the best-selling album by a female artist in Canada in the 1980s, beating the previous best-seller, Cyndi Lauper's She's So Unusual, which sold more than 900,000 copies in the country. Houston's debut became the first album by a female artist to earn the-10-times platinum mark—diamond level—for sales of 1,000,000 units by the Canadian Recording Industry Association (CRIA) on March 31, 1987.
 Houston's first release, Whitney Houston, is the best-selling album by a female and a new artist in the 1980s in the United States, certified 9× platinum by the Recording Industry Association of America (RIAA) on October 6, 1988. The album was later certified 14× platinum (or Diamond) by RIAA.
 Whitney Houston held the record for the highest one-week single sales by a female artist, with 632,000 copies sold of "I Will Always Love You" in the week ended December 27, 1992ㅡthe Billboard magazine issue date of January 9, 1993. This record was surpassed by Adele's "Hello", which sold over one million copies on the Billboard week ending November 14, 2015.
  "I Will Always Love You" was certified 4× platinum for shipments of over 4 million copies by the RIAA on January 12, 1993, making Houston the only and first female artist with a physical single to reach that level in the RIAA history. According to Nielsen SoundScan, as of 2009, the single sold 4,591,000 copies in the United States, and became the best-selling single by a female artist, and overall the second, only behind Elton John's "Candle in the Wind 1997/Something About the Way You Look Tonight." The single was certified Diamond by the RIAA on January 12, 2022, making Houston's first Diamond single and the third female artist who had a Diamond single, behind Taylor Swift and Mariah Carey.
 In the United Kingdom, "I Will Always Love You" was the best-selling single of all-time by a female solo artist, selling 1.361 million copies in 1992/93, a sales record that was later broken by Cher's "Believe", which sold 1.673 million units in 1998/99. In Japan, the single was also the best-selling single of all-time by a foreign female artist at the time, selling 810,000 copies in 1992-93. Worldwide, It sold over 20 million copies and became the best-selling single of all-time by a female artist.
 The Bodyguard Original Soundtrack Album set a record for the most albums sold in a single week since the Nielsen SoundScan introduced a computerized sales monitoring system in May 1991, with sales of 1,061,000 copies during Christmas week of 1992, becoming the first album sold over 1 million in one week. 
 The Bodyguard Soundtrack received the largest initial certification of any album for 6× platinum by the RIAA on January 18, 1993. The record was broken by 'N SYNC's No Strings Attached, certified 7× platinum initially in April 2000.
 Whitney Houston hit the 10 million mark by the RIAA on January 25, 1994, and made it the first album and the first debut album by a female artist to attain the certification. As a result, in 1999, the RIAA mark her debut album 13× platinum. She also became the first female artist to have three 10× platinum albums with the album, Whitney, and The Bodyguard Soundtrack, the latter earned 18× platinum certification in November 2017 and the middle earned 10× platinum in 2020.
 In 1994, Houston received an award from the World Music Awards, for the "Best-selling Female Artist".
 On March 16, 1999, when the RIAA launched the Diamond Awards, Houston received two diamond awards with her self-titled debut and The Bodyguard Soundtrack, she along with Mariah Carey would receive two awards at the celebration. Besides Houston and Carey, as of today, Madonna, Céline Dion, Britney Spears, Shania Twain, Adele and the Dixie Chicks are the only female artists with multiple diamond albums.
 In November 1999, Houston and The Bodyguard Soundtrack, were named the "Top-selling Female R&B Artist of the Century" and "Top-selling Soundtrack Album of the Century" by the RIAA, respectively.
 The Bodyguard Soundtrack is the best-selling soundtrack album of all-time in the United States with 18× platinum certifiaction by the RIAA and sales of 13,125,000 copies, combined 11,815,000 units from SoundScan with additional 1,310,000 sold at the BMG Music Clubs. The album also holds the title for the world's biggest selling soundtrack album of all-time with over 45 million units sold.
 The Bodyguard Soundtrack is the first pop album to sell over one million copies by a foreign artist in South Korea. To date, its sales exceeded 1.2 million in that country. In Japan, it was certified 2× million by the Recording Industry Association of Japan (RIAJ) in 1994, for the first time to achieve that feat by a foreign artist in Japanese music history, and became the best-selling foreign album with 2.8 million copies sold. The record was later broken by Mariah Carey's #1's, certified 3× million in 1998.
 Houston's rendition of "The Star Spangled Banner," performed by her at Super Bowl XXV in 1991, a charity single, became certified platinum in October 2001, it raised money for soldiers of the Persian Gulf War in 1991, the victims of 9/11; in its re-release in 2001.

Chart records

Billboard Hot 100 
 Whitney Houston was one of the biggest-selling solo female artists of the past three decades, indeed she is considered one of the most successful artists of all time.
 Houston's debut album, Whitney Houston, is the first album by a female artist and new artist to yield three No. 1 singles—"Saving All My Love for You" (October 1985), "How Will I Know" (February 1986) and "Greatest Love of All" (May 1986).
 When the fourth single "Where Do Broken Hearts Go" from her second album, Whitney, reached the top of the Billboard Hot 100 Singles chart on April 23, 1988, Houston became the first female artist to achieve four No. 1 singles from one album, and also the first and only artist in pop history to have seven consecutive No. 1 hits, with three from her first release and four from her second album; "I Wanna Dance with Somebody (Who Loves Me)" (June 1987), "Didn't We Almost Have It All" (September 1987), "So Emotional" (January 1988), and "Where Do Broken Hearts Go".
 With seven consecutive number one songs, Houston holds the title for the most number one hits by a female artist in the 1980s, shared only by Madonna.
 Houston's recording of "The Star Spangled Banner" reached the number twenty on the Hot 100 Singles chart in March 1991, making her the only act to turn the national anthem into a pop hit. The single was re-released in September 2001 and peaked at number six on the chart, becoming the first and the only version of the national anthem to achieve that feat in music history.
 "I Will Always Love You" topped the Hot 100 for fourteen consecutive weeks from November 28, 1992 to February 27, 1993, making it the longest-running number one single ever by a female solo artist and from a soundtrack album. As of today; Houston, Mariah Carey, Brandy, Monica, Kelly Rowland, Beyoncé, Toni Braxton, Rihanna, Destiny's Child, Debby Boone, Olivia Newton-John, Ashanti and Adele are the only female artists to have at least one double-digit run at number one on the chart.
 The fourteen-week domination of "I Will Always Love You" kept Houston in the pole position of the chart for all of January and February, marking the first time in history where Billboard didn't receive a new number one song until March.
 Since 1991, when the Hot 100 using Broadcast Data System and SoundScan data, Houston has become the first female artist to place three songs inside the top 11 in the same week with "I Will Always Love You", "I'm Every Woman", and "I Have Nothing" for three weeks in March 1993.
 "Exhale (Shoop Shoop)" was the third single ever to debut at number one on the Billboard Hot 100 (and the second single by a female artist, the first being Mariah Carey). After spending one week at the top, it spent eleven consecutive weeks at number two from December 2, 1995 to February 10, 1996, behind Carey's One Sweet Day, setting the record for the longest stay in the runner-up position  and tying Olivia Rodrigo's Good 4 U in 2021.

Hot 100 Single Sales
 "I Will Always Love You" topped the Hot 100 Single Sales chart for fourteen weeks, a record by a female artist as a solo, which she also shares with Mariah Carey.

Hot Adult Contemporary 
 In the 1980s, Houston had seven number one hits on the Billboard Hot Adult Contemporary chart, setting a record for the most number one singles by a female artist in the decade—"Saving All My Love for You" for three weeks (October 1985), "How Will I Know" for one week (February 1986), "Greatest Love of All" for five weeks (May 1986), "I Wanna Dance with Somebody (Who Loves Me)" for three weeks (July 1987), "Didn't We Almost Have It All" for three weeks (September 1987), "Where Do Broken Hearts Go" for three weeks (April 1988), and "One Moment in Time" for two weeks (October 1988).

Billboard Dance Club Play 
 Houston was ranked the thirteenth most successful dance club act in the chart's history.

Billboard 200 Albums 
 Houston's self-titled debut, Whitney Houston, spent 14 weeks at the top on the Billboard 200 chart (formerly Top Pop Albums) in 1986, setting a record for the longest runs at number one by a female newcomer of all-time and the second overall behind Men at Work's Business as Usual, which had 15 weeks on the summit. In addition, the album was the longest running number one album by a female artist during the 1980s and one week shy of the all-time record for Carole King's Tapestry.
 Whitney, her second set, became the first album by a female artist to debut at number one on the Billboard 200 chart, the issue date of June 27, 1987. Previous to the Billboard 200's employment of SoundScan data in May 1991, Houston is one of just five artists to start in the top slot with Elton John (Captain Fantastic and the Brown Dirt Cowboy and Rock of the Westies), Stevie Wonder (Songs in the Key of Life), Bruce Springsteen (Live/1975–85) and Michael Jackson (Bad).
 Whitney'''s 11-straight-week reign on the chart from June 27 to September 5, 1987, made Houston to hold two decade records by a woman: the most consecutive chart-topping streaks and the most cumulative weeks at number one in the 1980s.
 Whitney Houston and Whitney are the only albums by a female artist to occupy number one position of the chart for 10 weeks or more in the 1980s, which made Houston the only artist to have two double-digit run at the top of the chart in the decade of the 80s.(can check list of the United States' No. 1 albums)
 The Bodyguard Soundtrack topped the chart for non-consecutive twenty weeks, the second longest tenure by any album on the Billboard 200 chart in the Nielsen SoundScan era after Adele's 21, which spent 24 weeks in 2011-12.
 In the Billboard 200's 54-year history, Houston is the only artist to have three number one albums to top the chart for 11 weeks or more. Besides Houston's three albums, as of today, the only seven number one albums by women have ruled the chart for 11 weeks or more: Adele's 21 (2011, 24 weeks), Carole King's Tapestry (1971, 15 weeks), Judy Garland's Judy at Carnegie Hall (1961, 13 weeks), Alanis Morissette's Jagged Little Pill (1995, 12 weeks), Mariah Carey's Mariah Carey (1991, 11 weeks), Taylor Swift's Fearless (2008, 11 weeks) and Swift's 1989 (2014, 11 weeks).
 Houston's four No. 1 albums have spent a total of 46 weeks at the summit of the chart, a record for the most cumulative weeks at number one by a female artist. The record was broken by Taylor Swift in 2020 when her studio album Folklore spent its seventh week at number one bringing her total week at number one to 47.
 Whitney Houston (14 weeks): March 8 - April 19, 1986 (first run, 7 weeks), May 17 - June 28, 1986 (second run, 7 weeks)
 Whitney  (11 weeks): June 27 - September 5, 1987
 The Bodyguard Soundtrack (20 weeks): December 12, 1992 - March 6, 1993 (first run, 13 weeks), April 3, 1993 (second run, 1 week), April 17 - May 1, 1993 (third run, 3 weeks), May 15–29, 1993 (fourth run, 3 weeks)
 I Look to You (1 week): September 19, 2009
 Houston became the first woman to place three albums in the top 10 of the Billboard 200 chart at the same time, the issue dated March 10, 2012: Whitney: The Greatest Hits (No. 2), The Bodyguard Soundtrack (No. 6) and Whitney Houston (No. 9).
 Houston became the first woman to place nine albums in the top 100 of the Billboard 200 chart at the same time, the issue dated March 17, 2012: Whitney: The Greatest Hits (No. 2), The Bodyguard Soundtrack (No. 5), Whitney Houston (No. 10), I Look to You (No. 13), Triple Feature (No. 21), My Love Is Your Love (No. 31), I'm Your Baby Tonight (No. 32), Just Whitney (No. 50) and The Preacher's Wife Soundtrack (No. 80).Whitney Houston Albums and Singles Chart History|Billboard.www.billboard.com

Top Gospel Albums
 Whitney has the longest stay at number one on the Billboard Top Gospel Albums Chart, when The Preacher's Wife remained at number one for twenty-six weeks.

 Billboard Year-End charts 
 Houston's debut, Whitney Houston, was the "No. 1 Album of the Year" (Top Pop Album) on the 1986 Billboard magazine year-end charts, making Houston the first female artist to earn that distinction. The album was also the "No. 1 Black Album of the Year" (later Top R&B/Hip-Hop Album), becoming the first album by a female solo artist and the first debut album, topped both pop and black album year-end charts simultaneously in a single year.
 Houston was named "Top Pop Artist of the Year" in 1986, which made her the first black female artist and overall the second female artist behind Madonna in the previous year to achieve that feat. The award originated in 1983.
 With The Bodyguard Soundtrack and "I Will Always Love You" single in 1993, Houston became the first and only artist to grab the top spots of "Billboard 200 Albums," "Top R&B Albums", "Hot 100 Singles", and "Hot R&B Singles" year-end charts at the same time in music history.
 Houston has won "No. 1 R&B Album of the Year" three times for Whitney Houston in 1986, I'm Your Baby Tonight in 1991 and The Bodyguard Soundtrack in 1993, setting a record for the most year-end number one albums by any artist in R&B category. In addition, Houston is the only female artist to top the Billboard 200 year-end chart two times; her debut and The Bodyguard Soundtrack. Comprehensive charts 
 Houston holds the record for the most triple-crown hits by a female artist, topped all of three Billboard charts; Hot 100, R&B, and Adult Contemporary chart, with four singles—"Saving All My Love for You",  "How Will I Know", "All the Man That I Need", and "I Will Always Love You". (the all-time record belongs to Lionel Richie who achieved that feat with five chart-toppers including a number one hit, "Three Times a Lady", during his career as a member of the Commodores, but the record for a solo artist has been shared by Houston.)
 "I Will Always Love You" ruled Billboard charts in three categories for the fifth week in a row from December 19, 1992 to January 16, 1993: the Hot 100, R&B, and Adult Contemporary chart, setting a record for the most weeks at number one on the charts simultaneously.
 With The Bodyguard Soundtrack and "I Will Always Love You", Houston dominated a record thirteen Billboard charts at the same time in January 1993: Billboard 200, Top R&B Albums, Hot 100 Singles, Hot R&B Singles, Hot Adult Contemporary, Top Singles Sales, Top 40 Radio Monitor, Top 40 Airplay/Mainstream, Top 40 Airplay/Rhythm-crossover, R&B Singles Sales, R&B Radio Monitor, Eurochart Hot 100 Singles, and Eurochart Albums.

 Other records/awards 
 Whitney Houston has won 22 American Music Awards including two special awardsㅡAward of Merit in 1994 and International Artist Award in 2009. Taylor Swift is the only female solo artist to have won more (23), breaking Houston's record in 2018.
 Houston received total thirteen AMA nominations with materials from her debut album, six in 1986; also the all-time record as a newcomer and seven in 1987, which made her to hold the record for the most nominations from one album in AMA history.
 Houston's performance of Saving All My Love For You during the 1986 Grammy telecast later earned her an Emmy Award for Outstanding Individual Performance in a Variety or Music Program.
 Houston garnered more American Music Awards than any other female artist at its 14th ceremony of 1987, pulling in five wins, the all-time record by a female artist at the time,ㅡFavorite Pop/Rock Female Artist, Favorite Pop/Rock Album for Whitney Houston, Favorite Soul/R&B Female Artist, Favorite Soul/R&B Female Album for Whitney Houston and Favorite Soul/R&B Video for "Greatest Love of All".
 At the 21st American Music Awards of 1994, Houston's eight wins; Favorite Pop/Rock Female Artist, Favorite Pop/Rock Album, Favorite Pop/Rock Single, Favorite Soul/R&B Female Artist, Favorite Soul/R&B Album, Favorite Soul/R&B Single, Favorite Adult Contemporary Artist and Award of Merit as a special award, set a record for the most AMAs ever won by a female artist in a single year, tying Michael Jackson's all-time mark at the 11th American Music Awards.
 Houston's AMA records in each category:
 The most won for Favorite Pop/Rock Female Artist ㅡ 4 (1987, 1988, 1989 and 1994, tied with Olivia Newton-John)
 The most won by a female artist for Favorite Pop/Rock Album ㅡ 2 (Whitney Houston in 1987 and The Bodyguard Soundtrack in 1994)
 The most won by a female artist for Favorite Pop/Rock Single ㅡ 2 ("I Wanna Dance with Somebody (Who Loves Me) in 1987 and "I Will Always Love You" in 1994)
 The most won by a female artist for Favorite Sou/R&B Single ㅡ 2 ("You Give Good Love" in 1986 and "I Will Always Love You" in 1994, tied with Diana Ross and Janet Jackson).
 At its 4th ceremony on December 8, 1993, Houston won a record eleven Billboard Music Awards for The Bodyguard Soundtrack and "I Will Always Love You"; #1 Album of the Year, The Album Most Weeks at #1, #1 Hot 100 Singles Artist, #1 Hot 100 Single of the Year, The Single Most Weeks at #1, #1 R&B Album of the Year, #1 R&B Singles Artist, #1 R&B Single of the Year, #1 Soundtrack Album, #1 World Artist and #1 World Single. (see the clip of her acceptance of the awards at the ceremony—part 1, part 2)
 Houston received five awards at the 6th World Music Awards in 1994, setting a record for the most WMAs won in a single year—World's Best Selling Overall Recording Artist, World's Best Selling Pop Artist of the Year, World's Best Selling R&B Artist of the Year, World's Best Selling American Recording Artist of the Year, and World's Best Selling Female Recording Artist of the Era. (the record was shared by Michael Jackson in 1996, 50 Cent in 2003, and Lady Gaga in 2010)
 Whitney is the most covered artist on the TV Show American Idol with over 1,150 of 70,000 auditions being songs of hers during the show's third season. The song "I Have Nothing" has been performed in the finals or semi-finals six times—by Trenyce and Leah LaBelle, respectively in 2003, Jennifer Hudson in 2004, Vonzell Solomon in 2005, Katharine McPhee in 2006, and LaKisha Jones in 2007, more than any other song in history of the show.
 Whitney is the only artist with at least one Grammy, Emmy, MTV Video Music Award, MTV Movie Award, People's Choice Award, and Billboard Music Award to their name.
 As of 2007, Houston is the most performing female artist at Wembley Arena in London with 29 appearances during her career.

 International charts records 
 Whitney Houston is the longest-running number one album ever by a female artist on the Canadian Albums Chart (from RPM magazine) in the 1980s, spending 18 consecutive weeks at the top from March 8 to July 5 in 1986. (see the list of Canadian number-one albums)
 As Whitney topped the Canadian Albums Chart for 11 consecutive weeks from June 27 to September 5, 1987, which made Houston to hold the record for the most cumulative weeks at number one of the chart in the 1980s, staying a total 29 weeks atop with her two releases. (see the list of Canadian number-one albums in 1987)
 Houston became the first black female artist to top the Australian Albums Chart (from Kent Music Report) with her 1985 debut, Whitney Houston. In 1986, the album stayed at the summit of the chart for 11 non-consecutive weeks, a record for the longest-stay by a woman during the 1980s. (see the list of number-one albums of the 1980s in Australia)
 Whitney'' is the first album by a female artist to debut at number one on the albums charts simultaneously in the United States and the United Kingdom.
 "I Will Always Love You" topped the UK Singles Chart for ten consecutive weeks from December 5, 1992 to February 6, 1993, breaking a previous record for the longest-running number one single by a solo female artist in history of the chart; 9-week reign by Doris Day with "Secret Love" in 1954.(the record was shared by Rihanna with "Umbrella" in 2007)
 Houston has the longest concurrent topping of the U.S., the U.K., and Australian singles charts when "I Will Always Love You" spent eight-straight-weeks simultaneously topping the charts. In addition, "I Will Always Love You" is the only song to have a double-digit run at the pole position of all the singles chart in Australia, Canada, New Zealand, the United Kingdom, and the United States.
 In Australia, December 20, 1992 - February 21, 1993 (10 weeks)
 In Canada, December 19, 1992 - February 20, 1993 (10 weeks)
 In New Zealand, December 18, 1992 - March 18, 1993 (14 weeks)
 In the United Kingdom, December 5, 1992 - February 6, 1993 (10 weeks)
 In the United States, November 28, 1992 - February 27, 1993 (14 weeks)
 In the British music history, Houston is the only artist to be placed in the top 10 of the UK Year-End Singles Chart for two consecutive years with one single, "I Will Always Love You", ranked number one in 1992, and number ten in 1993.
 "I Will Always Love You" was named the Top Australian Single of the 1990s by a female artist.

References

Records and achievements
Houston